Mujhe Jeene Do is a 1999 Urdu film, produced in Pakistan and  directed by Javed Sheikh. The film stars Meera,  Babar Ali, Sana and Javed Sheikh. The film's music is by Amjad Bobby.

Cast 
MeeraBabar AliSanaJaved SheikhNayyar EjazIsmail Tara

Awards
 Nigar Award for Best Sound for Mujhe Jeene Do (1999 film).

References

External links

1999 films
Pakistani romantic musical films
1990s Urdu-language films
Nigar Award winners
Urdu-language Pakistani films